Colin Fleming and Ken Skupski were the defending champions, but they were eliminated by Wesley Moodie and Dick Norman in the quarterfinals.
Dustin Brown and Rogier Wassen defeated Marcelo Melo and Bruno Soares 6–3, 6–3 in the final.

Seeds

Draw

Draw

External links
 Main Draw

2010 Open de Moselle